The Coxeter-James Prize is a mathematics award given by the Canadian Mathematical Society (CMS) to recognize outstanding contributions to mathematics by young mathematicians in Canada. First presented in 1978, the prize is named after two renowned Canadian mathematicians, Donald Coxeter and Ralph James.

The prize is awarded annually to a young Canadian mathematician who has made significant contributions to the field of mathematics. It is intended to recognize and encourage young mathematicians in Canada and to promote the development of mathematics in the country.

Recipients of the Coxeter-James Prize are selected by the CMS Research Committee and are typically honored at the Society's annual meeting.

The Coxeter-James Prize is one of several awards given by the Canadian Mathematical Society to recognize and encourage excellence in mathematics. Other awards given by the Society include the Jeffery–Williams Prize, the Krieger–Nelson Prize, and the Blair Spearman Doctoral Prize.

Recipients of the Coxeter–James Prize
The Canadian Mathematical Society has awarded the Coxeter–James prize to the following recipients:

See also
 List of mathematics awards

References

External links
 Canadian Mathematical Society

Awards of the Canadian Mathematical Society
Awards established in 1978
1978 establishments in Canada